Samarjit Roy Chowdhury (10 February 1937 – 9 October 2022) was a Bangladeshi painter. He was awarded Ekushey Padak in 2014 by the Government of Bangladesh.

Early life and education
Chowdhury was born on 10 February 1937 in Comilla District. In 1960 he graduated in Graphic Design from the Government Art Institute (later Faculty of Fine Art, Dhaka University). There he was guided by Zainul Abedin, Quamrul Hassan and others.

Career
Chowdhury joined the faculty of Dhaka University and worked for 43 years and retired as Professor in 2003. Then he served as Dean of the Department of Fine and Performing Arts of the Shanto-Mariam University of Creative Technology until 2010. As of 2014, he was serving as supernumerary professor at the University of Dhaka.

Personal life and death
Chowdhury died in Dhaka on 9 October 2022, at the age of 85.

Awards
 1st Prize in the Pakistan Textile Design Competition (1960)
 East Pakistan Railway Timetable Cover Design Prize (1960)
 Ekushey Padak (2014)

References

1937 births
2022 deaths
Recipients of the Ekushey Padak
University of Dhaka alumni
Academic staff of the University of Dhaka
People from Comilla District
20th-century Bangladeshi painters
21st-century Bangladeshi painters
Bangladeshi male artists
20th-century male artists
21st-century male artists